Agua Mineral Salus is a patented brand of mineral water produced by the company Salus SA. Its industrial base is in Lavalleja Department, Uruguay.

Logo and legend
At the site of the mineral springs, the company has created Parque Salus, a park for visitors that includes a forest area and the industrial installations, often hosting educational visits by schools. The logo of these grounds is a puma. It is related to a local legend about a puma that was drinking from this spring. The puma was said to be the protector of the spring. With the arrival of humans it disappeared, leaving the protection of the spring to them. Visitors can enter the cave of the spring where they can be served cups of water. Drinking from the spring is said to pass to them the spirit of force and vitality of the puma.

History
Salus products used to include the beer brand Cerveza Patricia. In October 2000 the company was bought by Danone and Ambev. Danone took the part of mineral waters and Ambev took over the beer. From that time, Danone discontinued some products, focusing on the production of still and carbonated water and of soft flavoured drinks. 

Until that date, Salus was using only glass bottles; from that date on, it uses mostly PET plastic bottles of 500 mL, 1.5, 2.25 and 5 litres, as well as glass bottles of 500 mL and 1 litre.

The company covers a large percentage of the local market and exports to Brazil under the trade mark Fuente del Puma.

Composition
According to the certified analysis of the Laboratorio Tecnológico del Uruguay of 2008, Salus mineral water contains 152 mg/L of dry residue at 180°C. It has a high mineral and low sodium content.

Range of products 
Present
 Salus mineral water (carbonated and not)
 Non-carbonated, flavoured mineral water (Salus Citrus, Salus Lemonade, Salus Orange, Salus Apple and Salus Pineapple)
 Carbonated, flavoured mineral water (Salus Grapefruit and Salus Orange)
Past
 Patricia Beer (now property of AmBev)
 Tonic water "Citral" (discontinued)
 Grapefruit juice Salus (discontinued)
 Orange juice Salus (discontinued)
 Cider Salus (discontinued)

External links 

Food and drink companies of Uruguay
Bottled water brands
Lavalleja Department
Uruguayan drinks
Uruguayan brands
Year of establishment missing
1905 establishments in Uruguay
Food and drink companies established in 1905